Brojë is a settlement in the former Kelmend municipality, Shkodër County, northern Albania. At the 2015 local government reform it became part of the municipality Malësi e Madhe.

References

Kelmend (municipality)
Populated places in Malësi e Madhe
Villages in Shkodër County